Concerns of a current and future shortage of medical doctors due to the supply and demand for physicians in the United States have come from multiple entities including professional bodies such as the American Medical Association (AMA), with the subject being analyzed as well by the American news media in publications such as Forbes, The Nation, and Newsweek. In the 2010s, a study released by the Association of American Medical Colleges (AAMC) titled The Complexities of Physician Supply and Demand: Projections From 2019 to 2034 specifically projected a shortage of between 37,800 and 124,000 individuals within the following two decades, approximately.

Healthcare in America itself may deteriorate for certain communities due to such trends, particularly in terms of the lack of access to specialty services in rural locations. In particular, a September 2022 report from the University of Hawaiʻi System found that the collection of islands faces "a severe physician shortage". A piece published that same month by Spectrum News 1 - Ohio described the Midwestern state as featuring a shortage "that's expected to hit rural areas the hardest." Mechanisms of structural inequality in the U.S. affect its national health due to past and current discrimination, particularly efforts to set people apart based on Americans' racial identities.

In the broader context of health across the globe, worries over a doctor shortage have occurred in multiple countries besides the U.S., with the World Health Organization (WHO) finding in 2006 that "an estimated shortage of almost 4.3 million doctors, midwives, nurses and support workers [exists] worldwide".

Background and trends
In February 2010, the general interest news-magazine Newsweek published in a report that the "annual number of American medical students who go into primary care has dropped by more than half since 1997" to the point where it had gotten "hard to get an appointment with the doctors who remain", the journal also commenting that "as many as half of primary-care providers have stopped taking new patients." In addition, a 2010s study released by the Association of American Medical Colleges (AAMC) titled The Complexities of Physician Supply and Demand: Projections From 2019 to 2034 specifically projected a shortage of between 37,800 and 124,000 individuals within the following two decades, approximately.

Known for serving as president of the American Academy of Family Physicians (AAFP), Sterling Ransone Jr., M.D., has commented that the demographics of American medical professionals will generate noticeable effects. "By 2032, the U.S. population's going to grow by about 10%, but those of us who are age 65 or older, we’re going to grow by about 47%," he has remarked, adding that by "that same year... probably about one-third of active physicians are going to be over age 65, so our physicians— we’re aging as well".

The AMA has cited increasing costs of higher education in America as a barrier to adequate growth in physician supply. In a 2022 article, the organization stated that "[m]edical school graduates typically finish school with about $200,000 in medical student-loan debt, which is often seen as an influential factor in specialty choice." The discussion of anticipated financial burdens from schooling itself can also result in a self-fulfilling prophecy.

Healthcare in America itself may deteriorate for certain communities due to the shortage of medical professionals; the potential harm caused by the lack of access to specialty services in rural locations has garnered specific attention. In December 2021, an article from the financial publication Forbes argued that the "lack of funding for residency slots to expand the pool of physicians in the U.S. has been an issue for more than two decades."

When evaluating specific states inside of the U.S., a September 2022 report from the University of Hawaiʻi System reported that the collection of islands "has a severe physician shortage" to the point that "statistics show the deficit is at least 750 full-time providers, with primary care specialties... [having] the greatest need." A piece published that same month by Spectrum News 1 - Ohio relayed that the Midwestern state features a shortage "that's expected to hit rural areas the hardest." The article noted that the Northeast Ohio Medical University "estimates there are 11.7 physicians per a population of 10,000 in the Buckeye state compared to 38.9 physicians for that same population in a metropolitan area."

Influences of past history and effects from discrimination

Mechanisms of structural inequality in the U.S. affect its national health due to past and current discrimination, particularly efforts to set people apart based on Americans' racial identities. The academic journal Health Services Research published a 2012 study by Darrell J. Gaskin, Ph.D. and a team of other analysts that reported how "[r]acial and ethnic disparities in primary care are well documented" given that "[d]isparities in health care may be caused by higher proportions of minorities living in 'medical deserts,' that is, communities with limited health care resources." In short, their "findings indicate that residential segregation matters" as "African[-]American segregation was negatively associated with the availability of physician services." As the U.S. doctor shortage worsens the natures of these 'deserts', in their view, the analysts advised policymakers to focus on "[e]xpanding community health centers and [also] subsidies programs for physicians to serve in underserved areas".

American scholars have theorized more broadly that, as detailed in the aforementioned Health Services Research report, aspects of cultural status such as "money, power, prestige, and social connectedness" influence medicine across the country such that "those with the most access and control over resources are in a better position to avoid risks, diseases, and the consequences of disease."

Issues and proposed actions
Socio-political news-magazine The Nation has argued in an article that a market-oriented system in the U.S., with its "fee-for-service framework", "remains embedded in American health care and endures as its dominant underlying driver" in a way that "places value on specialized services rather than on primary care" and thus serves as "a crucial factor behind the worsening shortage of primary-care doctors." Specifically, the publication has asserted that the financial methodology "compensates doctors, clinics, and hospitals based upon number and type of visits involved in a patient's care, creating incentives for unnecessary procedures, excessive clinic appointments, and the mountains of paperwork that have become the bane of American doctors’ daily lives."

Analyzing the possibility of expanded immigration to America to enhance the nation's workface, a piece from the general interest news-magazine Newsweek has reported,

A study by the Niskanen Center, a think tank based out of Washington, D.C., has found that the U.S. federal government's administrative processes within Medicare and other programs make the doctor shortage worse. "Medicare's residency funding was designed around the naïve assumption that private insurers would contribute their fair share to training" such that "funding is based solely on the number of Medicare patients a hospital sees", according to Niskanen analyst Robert Orr, with a structure coming about that "shortchanges geographic locations and facilities with fewer elderly patients" even "while separate programs exist to deliver funds to children’s hospitals and rural clinics, [since] Medicare dwarfs them."

Proposed efforts to change the viewpoints of medical students have received academic study. For example, an analysis explored in a Society of Teachers of Family Medicine (STFM) conference held in 2010 inside Jacksonville, Florida received wider distribution afterwards, with Dr. Julie Phillips of the Michigan State University College of Human Medicine (MSUCHM) and other scholars detailing what a 2006 to 2008 survey of approximately a thousand students at three allopathic U.S. medical schools found. The experts observed broadly that "contemporary physicians struggle to meet the high expectations set by patients and their profession with limited time and resources." Specifically, results indicated that only 145 survey respondents (14.8%) leaned towards having a career in primary care. Furthermore, 11.2% of first-year students expressed interest in that medical focus in contrast to how 10.8% of second-year students showed interest. In addition, third-year and fourth-year students expressed more interest in having a career in primary care, at 18.3% and 21.0%, respectively.

In the same study, those senior students rejected the widespread stereotypes about primary care. They did not believe that time constraints in medicine, such as short appointments, lead to poor doctor-patient relationships, which was most likely due to their increased first-hand experience with patients and doctors. Experts hypothesize that more student exposure to the life of physicians via shadowing may prevent prejudices and false assumptions about primary care. This study points out that junior and senior medical students are aware of the drawbacks associated with primary care, such as the relatively low salary, but what is more important to them is their interest in a particular specialty. These students relied less on the known perception of primary care and more on their own personal value that they attached to it. The more exposure that medical students have to primary care, the more likely they are to become interested in it as an invaluable gateway to medical treatment. This data suggests that the combination of earlier introduction to primary care and an emphasis on its value would propel medical students to choose a career in preventative care. Such proposals, however, would require the participation of numerous stakeholders.

Increasing medical students’ experience in primary care relies on the participation of stakeholders, including medical schools. They can create initiatives that may include increasing the number of internships revolving around primary care. From a financial perspective, medical schools can alleviate their cost of schooling through scholarships, so that a medical student’s selection of a specialty is not swayed by salary. Offering opportunities to become involved in this specialty, while providing financial support, would address two problems of recruiting primary care physicians: it would provide students with more ways to experience what it is like to specialize in preventative care; and it would allow students to take advantage of the opportunities offered by the school, instead of focusing on the financial aspect of medical school.

See also

Health policy
Health workforce
Healthcare in the United States
Medical deserts in the United States
Medical education in the United States
Physician shortage
Physicians in the United States
Primary care service area

References

Healthcare in the United States
Labor in the United States
Medical education in the United States
Social problems in medicine